The 1962 Campeonato Nacional de Fútbol Profesional, was the 30th season of top-flight football in Chile. Universidad de Chile won their third title following a 5–3 win against Universidad Católica in the championship play-off on 16 March 1963, also qualifying to the 1963 Copa de Campeones.

Final table

Results

Championship play-off

Title

Topscorer

See also
1962 Copa Preparación

Notes

References
RSSSF Page

Primera División de Chile seasons
Chile
1962 in Chilean football